William Roberts Allan (1880 – 1965) was a Scottish footballer who played as a goalkeeper. He had three spells at hometown club Falkirk (after also starting out locally with East Stirlingshire) and spent six seasons with Hibernian, featuring on the losing side in the 1914 Scottish Cup Final (lost to Celtic after a replay. He also had spells with Rangers and Albion Rovers, and made a final Scottish Football League appearance (in a total of more than 400) for Stenhousemuir in an emergency, aged 41. The closest he came to international recognition was a trial for the Scottish League XI in 1910 during his time at Hibs.

References

1880 births
Date of birth missing
1965 deaths
Date of death missing
Scottish footballers
Association football goalkeepers
Footballers from Falkirk
Scottish Football League players
East Stirlingshire F.C. players
Falkirk F.C. players
Rangers F.C. players
Hibernian F.C. players
Camelon Juniors F.C. players
Clackmannan F.C. players
Stenhousemuir F.C. players